Muḥammad ibn Buzurg-Ummīd (died February 20, 1162) was the son of Kiyā Buzurg-Ummīd, and the third ruler of the Nizari Ismailis from 1138 until 1162 based in Alamut.

Career

Upon the demise of Kiyā Buzurg-Ummīd on February 9, 1138, he was appointed as the commander of Alamut Castle by the third concealed Imam Hasan Al-Qāhir ibn Al-Muḥammad (القاهر) of the Nizārī Ismā'īlī state.  He died in 1162 and was succeeded by his son Hasan ‘Alā Dhīkr‘īhī's-Salām.

Succession

References

External links 
 Muhammad bin Kiya Buzrug Ummid

1162 deaths
Medieval legends
Iranian missionaries
Iranian Ismailis
People from Alamut
Daylamites
12th-century Iranian people
Nizari da'is
People of the Nizari–Seljuk wars
12th-century Ismailis